Joaquim Silva (born February 5, 1989) is a Brazilian mixed martial artist who competes in the Ultimate Fighting Championship. He currently competes in the lightweight division.

Background
Silva began training in various forms of martial arts as a youngster. He then starting training in Muay Thai, boxing and jiu-jitsu as a teenager before transitioning to mixed martial arts in 2009.

Mixed martial arts career
Silva made his professional mixed martial arts debut in October 2010. He compiled an undefeated record of 7-0, competing for various regional promotions in Brazil before trying out for The Ultimate Fighter in early 2014.

The Ultimate Fighter
In March 2015, it was announced that Silva was one of the fighters selected to be on The Ultimate Fighter: Brazil 4.

In his first fight on the show, Silva faced Carlos Costa. He won the fight via TKO in the third round.

In the quarterfinals, Silva faced off against Erick da Silva. He won the fight via unanimous decision.

In the semifinals, Silva faced Glaico França. He lost via submission in the first round.

Ultimate Fighting Championship
Silva made his official debut for the promotion on September 5, 2015 at UFC 191 where he faced fellow castmate Nazareno Malegarie. He won the fight via split decision.

Luque next faced Andrew Holbrook on July 8, 2016 at The Ultimate Fighter 23 Finale.  He won the fight by knockout in the first round.

Silva was expected to face promotional newcomer Gregor Gillespie on September 24, 2016 at UFC Fight Night 95. However, Silva pulled out of the fight citing injury and was replaced by former opponent Glaico França.

Silva was faced Mairbek Taisumov but he got injured and replaced by Reza Madadi on May 28, 2017 at UFC Fight Night 109. He won the fight by split decision.

Silva faced Vinc Pichel on January 27, 2018 at UFC on Fox: Jacaré vs. Brunson 2. He lost the fight by unanimous decision.

Silva faced Jared Gordon on December 15, 2018 at UFC on Fox 31. He won the fight via technical knockout in round three.  This win earned him the Fight of the Night award.

Silva faced Nasrat Haqparast on August 3, 2019 at UFC on ESPN 5. He lost the fight via knockout in the second round.

Silva faced Rick Glenn on June 19, 2021 at UFC on ESPN 25. He lost the bout via knockout just 37 seconds into the first round.

Silva faced Jesse Ronson, replacing injured Vinc Pichel, on October 1, 2022 at UFC Fight Night 211. He won the bout in the second round, dropping Ronson with a flying knee and then finishing him with ground and pound. This win earned him the Performance of the Night award.

Championships and accomplishments

Mixed martial arts
Ultimate Fighting Championship
Fight of the Night (One time) 
Performance of the Night (One time)

Mixed martial arts record

|-
|Win
|align=center|12–3
|Jesse Ronson
|TKO (knee and punches)
|UFC Fight Night: Dern vs. Yan
|
|align=center|2
|align=center|3:08
|Las Vegas, Nevada, United States
|
|-
|Loss
|align=center|11–3
|Ricky Glenn
|KO (punches)
|UFC on ESPN: The Korean Zombie vs. Ige
|
|align=center|1
|align=center|0:37
|Las Vegas, Nevada, United States
|
|-
|Loss
|align=center|11–2
|Nasrat Haqparast
|KO (punches)
|UFC on ESPN: Covington vs. Lawler
|
|align=center|2
|align=center|0:36
|Newark, New Jersey, United States
|
|-
|Win
|align=center|11–1
|Jared Gordon
|KO (punches)
|UFC on Fox: Lee vs. Iaquinta 2
|
|align=center|3
|align=center|2:39
|Milwaukee, Wisconsin, United States
|
|-
|Loss
|align=center|10–1
|Vinc Pichel
|Decision (unanimous)
|UFC on Fox: Jacaré vs. Brunson 2
|
|align=center|3
|align=center|5:00
|Charlotte, North Carolina, United States
|
|-
|Win
|align=center|10–0
|Reza Madadi
|Decision (split)
|UFC Fight Night: Gustafsson vs. Teixeira
|
|align=center|3
|align=center|5:00
|Stockholm, Sweden
| 
|-
|Win
| align=center| 9–0
| Andrew Holbrook
| KO (punches)
| The Ultimate Fighter: Team Joanna vs. Team Cláudia Finale
| 
| align=center|1
| align=center|0:34
| Las Vegas, Nevada, United States
|
|-
| Win
| align=center| 8–0
| Nazareno Malegarie
| Decision (split)
| UFC 191
| 
| align=center| 3
| align=center| 5:00
| Las Vegas, Nevada, United States
|
|-
| Win
| align=center| 7–0
| Leandro Vasconcelos
| TKO (punches)
| The Hill Fighters 3
| 
| align=center| 1
| align=center| 0:06
| Bento Gonçalves, Brazil
| 
|-
| Win
| align=center| 6–0
| Victor Rizzo
| Submission (armbar)
| Reto de Campeones 1
| 
| align=center| 1
| align=center| 4:57
| Mexico City, Mexico
|
|- 
| Win
| align=center| 5–0
| Fabio Lima Ferreira
| TKO (punches)
| Shooto Brazil 44
| 
| align=center| 1
| align=center| 4:45
| Goiânia, Brazil
|
|-
| Win
| align=center| 4–0
| Juilo Cezar Alves
| Submission (armbar)
| High Fight Rock 3
| 
| align=center| 1
| align=center| 3:15
| Anápolis, Brazil
|
|-
| Win
| align=center| 3–0
| Adalton Fernandes
| KO (punch)
| BMAT
| 
| align=center| 1
| align=center| 0:30
| Palmas, Brazil
|
|- 
| Win
| align=center| 2–0
| Lucas Blade
| Submission (rear-naked choke)
| Anapolis Fight Championship
| 
| align=center| 1
| align=center| 3:58
| Anápolis, Brazil
|
|- 
| Win
| align=center| 1–0
| Alan Lima
| TKO (punches)
| Hot Fight - Vale Tudo
| 
| align=center| 1
| align=center| 4:10
| Ipameri, Brazil
|
|-

Mixed martial arts exhibition record

|-
|Loss
|align=center| 2–1
|Glaico França
|Submission (rear-naked choke)
| The Ultimate Fighter: Brazil 4
| (airdate)
|align=center|1
|align=center|2:48
|Las Vegas, Nevada, United States
|
|-
|Win 
|align=center| 2–0
| Erick da Silva
| Decision (unanimous) 
| The Ultimate Fighter: Brazil 4
| (airdate)
|align=center|3
|align=center|5:00
|Las Vegas, Nevada, United States
|
|- 
|Win 
|align=center| 1–0
| Carlos Costa
| TKO (punches) 
| The Ultimate Fighter: Brazil 4
| (airdate)
|align=center|3
|align=center|1:47
|Las Vegas, Nevada, United States
|
|-

See also
 List of current UFC fighters
 List of male mixed martial artists

References

External links
 
 

Living people
1989 births
Brazilian male mixed martial artists
Lightweight mixed martial artists
Mixed martial artists utilizing Muay Thai
Mixed martial artists utilizing Brazilian jiu-jitsu
People from Anápolis
Ultimate Fighting Championship male fighters
Brazilian Muay Thai practitioners
Brazilian practitioners of Brazilian jiu-jitsu
People awarded a black belt in Brazilian jiu-jitsu
Sportspeople from Goiás